Bankas Snoras AB or simply SNORAS was a commercial bank, founded in Lithuania operating in all three Baltic states. It was a member of the financial group Konversbank and was listed on the NASDAQ OMX Vilnius stock exchange. On November 16, 2011, 100% of the bank shares were nationalized by the Lithuanian government and the bank was placed into temporary administration. On November 24, the bank was declared bankrupt. It had 4 billion litas in debt.

History
Bankas Snoras AB was founded 1992 as a regional bank of Šiauliai and renamed to its current name in 1993. It was recognised as the best bank in Lithuania in 2006 by financial publisher The Banker. However, an inspection at the bank in November 2011, revealed poor asset quality, weak risk management and lack of proper operating data. The check also revealed that the bank has ignored the central bank's recommendation to reduce operating risks.

Shareholders 

Snoras was listed on the NASDAQ OMX Vilnius stock exchange. Major shareholders, holding more than 5% of the shares of the company were:
 Vladimir Antonov – 67%
 Raimondas Baranauskas – 25%

Notable subsidiaries 
Snoras has invested in a variety of business, most notable are:
 Investment bank Finasta
 Latvian bank Latvijas Krājbanka

Bankruptcy 
In 2011, November 16, by the decision of the Government of the Republic of Lithuania, the bank's activities were suspended, its managers were dismissed due to the possible default of the bank's credit obligations, and due to suspicions of non-transparent financial activities of the bank's managers. All the bank's shares were taken over by the state, the Bank of Lithuania temporarily appointed administrator Simon Freakley to coordinate the bank's activities.

In 2011, November 24, the Bank of Lithuania applied to the court regarding the bankruptcy of AB bankas Snoras, on December 7. Bankruptcy proceedings have been filed against the bank. Neil Hunter Cooper took over as receiver.

In 2014, Snoro's bankruptcy administrator will complete the sale of Finasto. The loan portfolio, the bank's and real estate assets taken over from borrowers, both in Lithuania and abroad, are being sold. February 1, employment contracts with 134 bank employees were extended, another 4 employees were on paternity or pregnancy leave.

Investment in car industry 

Snoras, in 2018, purchased 29.8% of shares of Dutch sports car manufacturer Spyker Cars. In the same year, Snoras sold the stake in Spyker Cars. In 2010, Snoras became sponsor of Renault F1 team.

References 

Defunct banks of Lithuania
Companies based in Vilnius
Companies listed on Nasdaq Vilnius
Banks disestablished in 2011
Banks established in 1992
2011 disestablishments in Lithuania
Lithuanian companies established in 1992